Brutal Massacre is a 2007 American mockumentary comedy written and directed by Stevan Mena, and produced by Stevan Mena, Chris Aurilia, Jerry Aurilia, Tom Bambard, Timothy J. Bristoll, and Vincent Butta in association with the Aurilia Arts Productions and Crimson Films. The film stars David Naughton, Brian O'Halloran, Gerry Bednob, Ellen Sandweiss, Vincent Butta, and Ken Foree.

Synopsis
Harry Penderecki (David Naughton), a once heralded horror auteur, finds himself on the outside looking in at Hollywood. He hasn't had a hit film in years, and most in the industry, including his close friends, think he is washed up. Harry is given one last chance to redeem himself with what could be his best or last picture.

Brutal Massacre becomes just that as the cast and crew find themselves battling one mishap after another as Harry struggles to keep his sanity against overwhelming resistance to finish the picture and find himself at the top once again.

External links

Notes

American mockumentary films
Films shot in the Lehigh Valley